Pilosella floribunda (synonym Hieracium floribundum, also known as pale hawkweed, smoothish hawkweed, yellow hawkweed, and yellow devil hawkweed) is a species of noxious and herbaceous perennial plant from family Asteraceae that is known in Europe (particularly France) and can also be found in United States and Canada. It was believed that it was a hybrid of Pilosella caespitosa (Hieracium caespitosum and Pilosella lactucella (Hieracium lactucella).

Description
The plant is 10 to 36 inches tall. The flowers bloom from June to July, are clustered, and are 1/2 inch wide. The leaves are hairy and spatula shaped.

References

floribunda
Flora of Europe
Flora of North America